Serine dehydratase or  L-serine ammonia lyase (SDH) is in the β-family of pyridoxal phosphate-dependent (PLP) enzymes. SDH is found widely in nature, but its structural and properties vary among species. SDH is found in yeast, bacteria, and the cytoplasm of mammalian hepatocytes.  SDH catalyzes is the deamination of L-serine to yield pyruvate, with the release of ammonia.

This enzyme has one substrate, L-serine, and two products, pyruvate and NH3, and uses one cofactor, pyridoxal phosphate (PLP). The enzyme's main role is in gluconeogenesis in the liver's cytoplasm.

Nomenclature

Serine Dehydratase is also known as:
 L-serine ammonia-lyase
 Serine deaminase
 L-hydroxyaminoacid dehydratase
 L-serine deaminase
 L-serine dehydratase
 L-serine hydro-lyase

Structure
The holoenzyme SDH contains 319 residues, one PLP cofactor molecule. The overall fold of the monomer is very similar to that of other PLP-dependent enzymes of the Beta-family. The enzyme contains a large catalytic domain that binds PLP and a small domain. The domains are linked by two residues 32-35 and 138-146, with the internal gap created being the space for the active site

Cofactor Binding
The PLP cofactor is positioned in between the Beta-strands 7 and 10 of the large domain and lies on the large internal gap made between small and large domain. The cofactor is covalently bonded through a Schiff base linkage to Lys41. The cofactor is sandwiched between the side chain of Phe40 and the main chain of Ala222. Each of the polar substituents of PLP is coordinated by functional groups: the pyridinium nitrogen of PLP is hydrogen-bonded to the side chain of Cys303, the C3-hydroxyl group of PLP is hydrogen-bonded to the side chain of Asn67, and the phosphate group of PLP is coordinated by main chain amides from the tetraglycine loop.  (Figure 3 and Figure 4).

Mechanism
The reaction catalyzed by serine dehydratase follows the pattern seen by other PLP-dependent reactions. A Schiff base linkage is made and the aminoacrylate group is released which undergoes non-enzymatic hydrolytic deamination to pyruvate.

Inhibitors
According to the series of assays performed by Cleland (1967), the linear rate of pyruvate formation at various concentrations of inhibitors demonstrated that L-cysteine and D-serine competitively inhibit the enzyme SDH. The reason that SDH activity is inhibited by L-cysteine is because an inorganic sulfur is created from L-Cysteine via Cystine Desulfrase and sulfur-containing groups are known to promote inhibition. L-threonine competitively inhibits Serine Dehydratase as well.

Moreover, insulin is known to accelerate glycolysis and repress induction of liver serine dehydratase in adult diabetic rats. Studies have been conducted to show insulin causes a 40-50% inhibition of the induction serine dehydratase by glucagon in hepatocytes of rats. Studies have also shown that insulin and epinephrine inhibit Serine Dehydratase activity by inhibiting transcription of the SDH gene in the hepatocytes.  Similarly, increasing levels of glucagon, increase the activity of SDH because this hormone up-regulates the SDH enzyme. This makes sense in the context of gluconeogenesis. The main role of SDH is to create pyruvate that can be converted into free glucose. And glucagon gives the signal to repress gluconeogenesis and increase the amount of free glucose in the blood by releasing glycogen stores from the liver.

Homocysteine, a compound that SDH combines with Serine to create cystathionine, also noncompetitively inhibits the action of SDH. Studies have shown that homocysteine reacts with SDH's PLP coenzyme to create a complex. This complex is devoid of coenzyme activity and SDH is not able to function (See Enzyme Mechanism Section). 
In general, homocysteine is an amino acid and metabolite of methionine; increased levels of homocysteine can lead to homocystinuria(see section Disease Relevance).

Biological function
In general, SDH levels decrease with increasing mammalian size. 

SDH enzyme plays an important role in gluconeogenesis. Activity is augmented by high-protein diets and starvation. During periods of low carbohydrates, serine is converted into pyruvate via SDH. This pyruvate enters the mitochondria where it can be converted into oxaloacetate, and, thus, glucose.

Little is known about the properties and the function of human SDH because human liver has low SDH activity. In a study done by Yoshida and Kikuchi, routes of glycine breakdown were measured. Glycine can be converted into serine and either become pyruvate via serine dehydratase or undergo oxidative cleavage into methylene-THF, ammonia, and carbon dioxide. Results showed the secondary importance of the SDH pathway.

Disease relevance
SDH may be significant in the development of hyperglycemia and tumors.

Nonketotic hyperglycemia is due to the deficiency of threonine dehydratase, a close relative of serine dehydratase. Serine dehydratase has also been found to be absent in human colon carcinoma and rat sarcoma. The observed enzyme imbalance in these tumors shows that an increased capacity for the synthesis of serine is coupled to its utilization for nucleotide biosynthesis as a part of the commitment to cellular replication in cancer cells. This pattern is found in sarcomas and carcinomas, and in tumors of human and rodent origin.

Evolution
Human and rat serine dehydratase cDNA are identical except for a 36 amino acid residue stretch.  Similarities have also been shown between yeast and E. coli threonine dehydratase and human serine dehydratase. Human SDH shows sequence homology of 27% with the yeast enzyme and 27% with the E. coli enzyme. Overall PLP enzymes exhibit high conservation of the active site residues.

External links

References